This is a list of American films released in 2018.

Box office 
The highest-grossing American films released in 2018, by domestic box office gross revenue, are as follows:

January–March

April–June

July–September

October–December

See also 
 List of 2018 box office number-one films in the United States
 2018 in the United States

References

External links 

 

Films
American
2018